Yawar Fiesta is the first novel by the Peruvian author José María Arguedas, published in 1941. It is considered as part of the Latin-American indigenista movement. Set in the village of Puquio (in the Southern Sierra of Peru) it depicts the performance of a bullfight in the Andean style (turupukllay) as part of a celebration called 'yawar punchay'. According to critics, it is the most successful of Arguedas' novels, from a formal point of view. The author's effort is appreciated for offering the most authentic version possible of Andean life, without resorting to convention or the paternalism of previous indigenous literature.

Plot
The novel relates one of the most traditional customs of the indigenous communities of Peru: the "Indigenous bullfight", that takes place every year on the 28th of July, the anniversary of the founding of Peru. The indigenous bullfight is a spectacular event where a bull (which wears a "pampon") must confront one or two hundred "Indians" who can be professional toreros or spontaneous "capeadores". The event is accompanied by elements such as music of wakwak'ras (trumpets made from the bulls' horns), traditional chants (huaynos), consumption of hard liquor, usage of dynamite in order to kill the bull, and even death of the participants who were gored during the event. This tradition is threatened by an order from the capital, which prohibits what is considered a 'barbarian' practice. Faced with the refusal of the Indians to comply with the order, the authorities seek a way to allow the bullfights to be performed 'decently': by hiring a professional bullfighter (toreador) who will flight in the 'Spanish' tradition. With this, the very essence of the festival is threatened, but it is ultimately carried out anyway, the Indians reinstating their tradition in the eyes of the village leaders. It is worth noting that Arguedas' story does not mention the tying of a condor to the back of the bull, that is currently the most well-known variant of Yawar Fiesta.

Composition
The theme of an Andean (or 'Indian') style bullfight as the center of a conflict between races and social groups in a village in the Peruvian Andes came to Arguedas when, according to his confession, he attended a bullfight in Puquio in July 1935. On this occasion one of the Indian capeadors (matador assistants), nicknamed Honrao, was gored by the bull. In 1937 Arguedas published two stories which preceded the novel. One entitled "The Dispossession", which appeared in the Lima magazine 'Palabra', No. 4, April (which later became the second chapter of the novel); and the other entitled "Yawar (Festival)", published in the 'Revista Americana', Year XIV, No. 156, in Buenos Aires (which is a primitive draft of the novel). His desire to remake the story was interrupted by his stay at the El Sexto prison, between 1937 and 1938, therefore he could only re-start writing in the second half of 1940, after attending the Indian Congress of Patzcuaro, in Mexico. He was then in Sicuani, where he was teaching at a public school. Taking advantage a school vacation, Arguedas wrote the novel non-stop. One incentive was a competition of Latin-American novels announced by a publisher in the United States: juries gathered in each Hispanic country were to select a representative novel which would be sent to an international jury sponsored by said publisher. In Peru, the national jury consisted of Augusto Tamayo Vargas, Estuardo Núñez and Luis E. Valcárcel, among others. As he progressed on chapters of his novel Arguedas sent them to Lima, to his friend the poet Manuel Moreno Jimeno. The correspondence between them documents Arguedas' work in detail. But he must have been disappointed that his novel was not chosen to represent Peru in the international competition, being displaced by the work of an unknown, José Ferrando, entitled 'Panorama hacia el alba' (Panorama toward dawn). The winner of the international competition was the indigenous novel by Ciro Alegría, 'El mundo es ancho y ajeno' (Broad and Alien is the World), sent on behalf of Chile, where its author was exiled.

Themes
The principal theme is the performance of the Andean-style bullfight. Secondary themes are: the encroachment of white or misti (mestizo) people into Puquio, the abuses and violence of the gamonales (parasitic landlords) towards the Indians, the construction of the road from Puquio to Nazca, and the migration of thousands of Indians to Lima.

Analysis
Antonio Cornejo Polar remarks that

Julio Ramón Ribeyro has said of this novel that the author

References

Sources
 Arguedas, José María: Yawar Fiesta. Lima, PEISA, 2002. Gran Biblioteca de Literatura latinoamericana El Comercio, Tomo 15, con ficha de lectura. 
 Cornejo Polar, Antonio: Historia de la literatura del Perú republicano. Incluida en Historia del Perú, Tomo VIII. Perú Republicano. Lima, Editorial Mejía Baca, 1980. 
 Sánchez, Luis Alberto: La literatura peruana. Derrotero para una historia cultural del Perú, tomo V. Cuarta edición y definitiva. Lima, P. L. Villanueva Editor, 1975.
 Vargas Llosa, Mario: La utopía arcaica. José María Arguedas y las ficciones del indigenismo. Fondo de Cultura Económica. México, 1996. 

1941 novels
Works by José María Arguedas
Novels by José María Arguedas
Novels set in Peru
Fiction set in the 1940s